The 1987 Citizen Cup was a women's tennis tournament played on outdoor clay courts at the Am Rothenbaum in Hamburg, West Germany and was part of the Category 3 tier of the 1987 Virginia Slims World Championship Series. It was the 10th edition of the tournament and ran from 21 September until 27 September 1987. First-seeded Steffi Graf won the singles title.

Finals

Singles
 Steffi Graf defeated  Isabel Cueto 6–4, 6–2
 It was Graf's 9th singles title of the year and the 17th of her career.

Doubles
 Claudia Kohde-Kilsch /  Jana Novotná defeated  Natalia Bykova /  Leila Meskhi 7–6(7–1), 7–6(8–6)

References

External links
 ITF tournament edition details
 Tournament draws

Citizen Cup
WTA Hamburg
1987 in German tennis
1987 in German women's sport